Hans Westmar (full title:  "Hans Westmar. One of many. A German Fate from the Year 1929") was the last of an unofficial trilogy of films produced by the Nazis shortly after coming to power in January 1933, celebrating their Kampfzeit – the history of their period in opposition, struggling to gain power. 
The film is a partially fictionalized biography of the Nazi martyr Horst Wessel.

Development
Originally, the film, based on Hanns Heinz Ewers's novelistic biography, was named Horst Wessel. Goebbels temporarily banned it but eventually allowed its release with alterations and with the main character's name changed to the fictional "Hans Westmar".  One reason may have been to avoid "de-mystifying" Wessel. Part of the problem was that authentic depiction of Stormtroopers, including picking fights with Communists, did not fit the more reasonable tone that the Nazis adopted in power and would undermine Volksgemeinschaft. The fictionalised Westmar, unlike Wessel, does not alienate his family.

The film was, however, among the first films to depict dying for Hitler as a glorious death for Germany and as resulting in his spirit inspiring his comrades. His decision to go to the streets is presented as fighting "the real battle". Along with SA-Mann and Hitlerjunge Quex, Hans Westmar was the last of the trilogy of films released in 1933, and designed to present an idealized account of the Nazis' heroic struggle to come to power in Germany.

Plot
The film concentrates on the conflict with the Communist Party of Germany in Berlin in the late 1920s. When Westmar arrives in Berlin, the communists are popular, hold large parades through Berlin and sing "The Internationale". When he looks into the cultural life of Weimar Berlin, he is horrified at the "internationalism" and cultural promiscuity, which includes black jazz music and Jewish nightclub singers. That scene dissolves into images of the German fighting men of World War I and shots of the cemeteries of the German dead.

Westmar decides to help organize the local Nazi Party and becomes, through the course of the plot, responsible for its electoral victories, which encourages the Communists to kill him.

Depiction of communism
While communism as such is depicted as the foe, the communists fall into three categories. The party boss shamelessly transmits the party line from Moscow, and the short Jewish official incites violence and then flees, and both are directly responsible for the murder.

However, one communist is presented as an idealist fighting for the proletarian, and the last scene, on seeing a Nazi torchlight procession on the eve of the Nazi seizure of power, he is moved to salute the new Germany since Hans Westmar's example has inspired him.

Originally banned by Goebbels
The movie was originally called Horst Wessel. Ein deutsches Schicksal and was banned immediately after it was first shown in October 1933, since Horst Wessel was shown in prostitution and in a Christian milieu. According to the Nazi Film Review Office the film "does neither do justice to Horst Wessel's personality nor to the national socialist movement as the leader of the state".

Goebbels justified the ban as follows:
"As national socialists we do not particularly value to watch our SA marching on stage or screen. Her sphere are the streets. Should however somebody try to solve national socialist problems in the realm of art, he must understand that also in this case the art does not come from ambition but ability. Even an ostentatious display of a national socialist attitude is no substitute for an absence of true art. The national socialist government has never demanded the production of SA-movies. On the contrary: we see a danger in this excess. […] In no way does national socialism justify artistic failure. The greater the idea that shall find a form the greater the aesthetic demands have to be."

Only after the film was revised could it pass the censors.

See also
 List of German films 1919–1933
 List of German films 1933–1945
 Nazism and cinema

References

External links
 
 
 

1933 films
Nazi propaganda films
German black-and-white films
Films based on works by Hanns Heinz Ewers
Films of Nazi Germany
German biographical films
1930s German-language films
Films set in the 1920s
Films set in 1930
Horst Wessel
1930s biographical films
Films critical of communism
1930s German films